Witsanusak Kaewruang (born March 16, 1984), is a Thai professional footballer who plays as a goalkeeper.

International career

In 2014, he was called up to the national team by Kiatisuk Senamuang to play in the 2015 AFC Asian Cup qualification.

Honours

Club
Muangthong United
 Thai League 1 (1): 2016
 Thai League Cup (1): 2016

External links
 Profile at Goal

Living people
1984 births
Witsanusak Kaewruang
Witsanusak Kaewruang
Association football goalkeepers
Witsanusak Kaewruang
Witsanusak Kaewruang
Witsanusak Kaewruang
Witsanusak Kaewruang
Witsanusak Kaewruang
Witsanusak Kaewruang
Witsanusak Kaewruang
Witsanusak Kaewruang
Witsanusak Kaewruang